The 1993 Croatia Open was a men's tennis tournament played on outdoor clay courts in Umag, Croatia that was part of the World Series of the 1993 ATP Tour. It was the fourth edition of the tournament and was held from 23 August until 29 August 1993. First-seeded Thomas Muster won his second consecutive singles title at the event.

Finals

Singles
 Thomas Muster defeated  Alberto Berasategui, 7–5, 3–6, 6–3
 It was Muster's 6th singles title of the year and the 19th of his career.

Doubles
 Filip Dewulf /  Tom Vanhoudt defeated  Jordi Arrese /  Francisco Roig, 6–4, 7–5

References

External links
 ITF tournament edition details

Croatia Open Umag
Croatia Open
1993 in Croatian tennis